Brugine is a comune (municipality) in the Province of Padua in the Italian region Veneto, located about 40 km (25 miles) west of Venice and about 16 km (10 miles) southeast of Padua. As of 31 December 2004, it had a population of 6,579 and an area of 19.6 km².

The municipality of Brugine contains the frazione (subdivision) Campagnola.

Brugine borders the following municipalities: Bovolenta, Legnaro, Piove di Sacco, Polverara, Pontelongo, Sant'Angelo di Piove di Sacco.
In Brugine was born an  Italian clothing designer Renzo Rosso.

Demographic evolution

References

External links
 www.comune.brugine.pd.it/
 / La Famiglia Bertin - origine di Brugine/PD - in Portuguese

Cities and towns in Veneto